Jacono is a surname. Notable people with the surname include:

 Andrew A. Jacono (born 1970), American plastic surgeon
 Giovanni Jacono (1873−1957), Italian Roman Catholic prelate
 Nestor Jacono (1925-2014), Maltese athlete

See also 
 Lojacono